{{Infobox person
| name                      = Abdul Hameed Masho Khel
| image                     = Abdul-Hameed-Mashokhel.jpg
| image_size                =
| alt                       =
| caption                   = Abdul Hamid Mashokhel
| birth_name                =
| birth_date                =
| birth_place               =
| death_date                = Circa 1732
| death_place               =
| body_discovered           =
| death_cause               =
| resting_place             = Masho Gagar
| resting_place_coordinates = 
| nationality               =
| citizenship               =
| other_names               = Moshogaf (wekhte seronky)
| known_for                 = Pashto poetry
| education                 =
| alma_mater                =
| employer                  =
| occupation                =
| years_active              =
| networth                  =
| height                    =
| title                     =
| term                      =
| predecessor               =
| successor                 =
| party                     =
| opponents                 =
| boards                    =
| spouse                    =
| partner                   =
| children                  =
| parents                   =
| relations                 =
| callsign                  =
| awards                    =
| signature                 =
| website                   =
| footnotes                 =
}}Abdul Hameed Masho Khel (died  1732), also known as Abdul Hamid Baba', was an Afghan poet and Sufi figure.

 Biography 
Abdul Hameed baba Masho Khel was born in the second half of the 17th century (1664-1724 onward) at Masho Khel, a small village near Badaber Peshawar, a Pashtun tribe. Hameed travelled to Peshawar, where he undertook his education, and became a priest. At this point, Hameed was a man of considerable stature among intellectuals, and students from a number of surrounding districts came to receive instruction from him.

Hameed's poetry was written primarily in the Pashto language. His poems generally had a moral to them, and were often tinged with tones of contempt for the world and its lack of virtue. The morals of his poems were based on Sufism, as a large proportion of other Muslim poetry was.

Hameed's exact death date is not known, but it is thought by those in his home village that he died around the year 1732. He died in the same house that he had lived in for most of his life.

 Reception 
Hameed's poetry was popular even in Persia, where he was dubbed "Hameed the Hair-splitter".

The 19th century British officer and linguist Henry George Raverty calls Hameed Afghanistan's cynical poet and compares him to Saadi (c. 1210) in Persia, "the Saadi of the Pascho language"

Hameed's major works, Love's Fascination, The King and the Beggar and Pearls and Corals have all been translated into English.

 References 

 Further reading 
 Henry George Raverty: ÆBD-UL-ḤAMĪD (p. 85–86), in: Selections from the Poetry of the Afghans, from the 16th to the 19th Century: Literally translated from the original Pushto; with notices of the different authors, and remarks on the mystic doctrine and poetry of the Sūfīs'' (scan of full text), edited by Henry George Raverty, Williams & Norgate, London 1862
 Poetry of Hamid Baba
 Short Biography of Abdul Hamid Baba in Pashto language
 A Biography of Hameed Baba in Afghanpedia website
 A short Biography of Abdul Hameed Mashogagar in Dawatan website

Pashto-language poets
Pashtun people
People from Peshawar
1730s deaths
Year of birth unknown
Pashtun Sufis